Louise A Jackson (born March 20, 1937) is an American author of children's books, teacher, literacy consultant, speaker, and retired professor.

Early life and career
Jackson attended Leander High School before graduating in 1953 from Texas State University with degrees in elementary education and an MA in Curriculum and Instruction in 1957.

Jackson was appointed as the director of the Off-Campus Elementary Partnership Program at the University of Wyoming in 1978. In 1989, she became an associate dean at the University of Wyoming, where she directed the student teaching program and taught graduate and undergraduate courses in reading, language arts, and curriculum development.

Bibliography
Books by Louise A. Jackson

References

1937 births
Living people
Texas State University alumni
University of Wyoming faculty